Belhaven is a waterfront town in Beaufort County, North Carolina, United States. The population was 1,688 at the 2010 Census. Belhaven is located in North Carolina's Inner Banks region.

History
The Belhaven City Hall was listed on the National Register of Historic Places in 1981.

Healthcare
The community formerly had a hospital, Pungo District Hospital, which opened in 1949. Pantego Creek LLC, the operator, asked for a third party to acquire the hospital as the operator could not pay for the care of the large number of Medicaid and Medicare patients using the hospital. In 2011 Vidant Health acquired the hospital; in 2013 Vidant stated that it was unable to keep the hospital in operation due to poor finances and announced that it was going to close the hospital. Pantego Creek Board closed it in 2014, and it was demolished in 2016. Vidant opened a non-emergency clinic in the area.

Geography
Belhaven is located at  (35.542930, -76.623278), on the north shore of the Pungo River.

Climate

Demographics

2020 census

As of the 2020 United States census, there were 1,410 people, 756 households, and 377 families residing in the town.

2000 census
As of the census of 2000, there were 1,968 people, 827 households, and 530 families residing in the town. The population density was 1,313.4 people per square mile (506.6/km2). There were 1,015 housing units at an average density of 677.4 per square mile (261.3/km2). The racial makeup of the town was 37.30% White, 60.67% African American, 0.15% Native American, 0.46% Asian, 0.71% from other races, and 0.71% from two or more races. Hispanic or Latino of any race were 2.69% of the population.

There were 827 households, out of which 28.2% had children over  the age of 32 living with them, 38.6% were married couples living together, 22.0% had a female householder with no husband present, and 35.9% were non-families. 32.6% of all households were made up of individuals, and 16.6% had someone living alone who was 15 years of age or older. The average household size was 2.36 and the average family size was 2.99.

In the town, the population was spread out, with 24.7% under the age of 18, 7.1% from 18 to 24, 25.6% from 25 to 44, 23.6% from 45 to 64, and 19.1% who were 65 years of age or older. The median age was 41 years. For every 100 females, there were 81.9 males. For every -1 females age 18 and over, there were 7. males.

The median income for a household in the town was $16,674, and the median income for a family was $23,958. Males had a median income of $23,839 versus $16,741 for females. The per capita income for the town was $11,086. About 32.0% of families and 35.6% of the population were below the poverty line, including 41.6% of those under age 18 and 38.3% of those age 65 or over.

Government

City
 Ricky Credle, Mayor
 Greg Satterthwaite, Mayor Pro Tem
 Samuel (Tony) Williams, Council Member
 Vic Cox, Council Member
 Robert Stanley, Council Member
 Julian Goff, Council Member

Other

Christopher Kelly, Chief of Police

Education
Beaufort County Schools operates public schools. Northside High School is the local high school.

Belhaven High School, an all-black school, was built in 1950. The school's first principal was Greene T. (GT) Swinson. In operation until the late 1960s or early 1970s, it was transformed into an elementary school, Belhaven Elementary. The school is no longer in operation.

There is a private school, Pungo Christian Academy (K-12).

BHM Regional Library operates the Belhaven Public Library.

Notable people
 Eva Narcissus Boyd, singer
 C. J. Wilson - Oakland Raiders football player

References

External links
 Town of Belhaven official website 
 Belhaven Community Chamber of Commerce

Towns in North Carolina
Towns in Beaufort County, North Carolina